Cardiophorus elegans is a species of click beetles. It is found in Chile.

References 

 Arias-Bohart, E. and M. Elgueta. 2012. Catalogue of Chilean Elateridae. Annales Zoologici (Warszawa), 2012, 62(4): 643-668
 Blackwelder, R.E., 1944; (Elateridae, Cebrionidae, Melasidae [pars], Trixagidae [pars]) Checklist of the coleopterous insects of México, Central America, The West Indies, and South America. U.S. National Museum Bull. Nº185 (2): 275–276; 280–305.
 Bouchard, Patrice ; Yves Bousquet; Anthony E. Davies; Miguel A. Alonso-Zarazaga; John F. Lawrence; Chris H. C. Lyal; Alfred F. Newton; Chris A. M. Reid; Michael Schmitt; S. Adam Ślipiński; Andrew B. T. Smith. 2011. Family-group names in Coleoptera (Insecta). ZooKeys 88: 1–972 (April, 2011)
 Lawrence, J. F. and A. F. Newton, Jr. 1995. Families and subfamilies of Coleoptera (with selected genera, notes, references and data on family-group names). pp. 779–1006 in: J. Pakaluk and S.A. Slipinski (eds.): Biology, Phylogeny, and Classification of Coleoptera: Papers Celebrating the 80th Birthday of Roy A. Crowson. Museum i Instytut Zoologii PAN, Warszawa.
 Leschen, R. A. B.; Beutel, R. G. and Lawrence, J. F. (Editors); Slipinski, A. (Associate editor). 2009. Handbook of zoology. Coleoptera, Beetles, vol. 2: Morphology and Systematics (Elateroidea, Bostrichiformia, Cucujiformia partim).

External links 

 
 Cardiophorus elegans at the Interim Register of Marine and Nonmarine Genera
 Cardiophorus elegans at Coleoptera neotropical

Elateridae
Beetles described in 1878
Invertebrates of Chile
Endemic fauna of Chile